is one of the original 40 throws of Judo as developed by Kano Jigoro.  It belongs to the second group of the traditional throwing list in the Gokyo no waza of the Kodokan Judo.  It is also part of the current 67 Throws of Kodokan Judo.  It is classified as a foot technique (ashiwaza).

Technique description
Okuriashi harai is a double foot sweep from standing position. To execute the technique, extend the stepping motion of the opponent's leg towards his other leg by using your foot pushing against his foot's instep or side. The sweep is most effective against a retreating opponent and does not work if just one of his feet leaves the ground.

Similar techniques, variants, and aliases 
English aliases:

Similar techniques:
 de ashi harai: sweeping of one foot either forward or sideways
Harai tsuri komi ashi: sweeping one foot backwards

Further reading

See also
 Judo technique
 The Canon Of Judo

External links

Judo technique
Throw (grappling)
Martial art techniques